Abhishek Yadav (born 10 June 1980) is an Indian retired professional footballer who played as striker. Currently he is Deputy General Secretary of the All India Football Federation (AIFF).

Club career

During his youth, Yadav played for local team Rashtriya Chemical Fertilizers (RCF) in the 1998–99 season. After finding success at RCF, Yadav began his professional career at Mahindra United.

For the 2000–2001 season, Yadav signed with Churchill Brothers, but returned to Mumbai to play for Mahindra United after just a season. Yadav then spent five seasons with Mahindra United where he won all of the major Indian trophies - Durand Cup, IFA Shield, National Football League (the I-League replaced the NFL), Federation Cup and Mumbai League. In 2007, Abhishek joined Mumbai FC. After joining the newly founded club owned by the Essel Group, Yadav said the move was a "calculated risk" but cited David Booth and Henry Menezes as reasons for joining. The "calculated risk" paid off in 2008, when he helped the team win the I-League 2nd Division, thereby allowing the team to be promoted to the 1st Division of the I-League. Now captains the side and lead from the front scoring 9 goals for the season and the top scorer for the club.

International career

Yadav has played on the India national squad since 2002. At his debut, Yadav came off the substitutes bench and scored the winning goal in the LG Cup final against Vietnam. This was the first trophy India had won abroad in 28 years.

Honours

India
 AFC Challenge Cup: 2008
 SAFF Championship runner-up: 2008; third place: 2003
 Nehru Cup: 2007

India U23
 LG Cup: 2002

References

External links

Indian footballers
India international footballers
India youth international footballers
1980 births
Living people
Sportspeople from Kanpur
Footballers from Uttar Pradesh
Mumbai FC players
2011 AFC Asian Cup players
I-League players
Churchill Brothers FC Goa players
Mahindra United FC players
Mumbai City FC players
Indian Super League players
Association football forwards
Association football wingers
Footballers at the 2002 Asian Games
Asian Games competitors for India